Winaero Tweaker is a freeware utility software for Microsoft Windows that allows the user to modify the interface, settings, and features of the operating system. It is made by Russian software developer Sergey Tkachenko, who runs the Winaero website. It is available for Windows 7, Windows 8, Windows 10, and Windows 11.

The software includes many of the applications that Tkachenko had published that were previously available as standalone downloads. The first version was released in March, 2015 as an "all-in-one" app for tweaking Windows.

History
Tkachenko has been developing apps for modifying Windows since 2010. He started Winaero.com in July 2011 as a way to share his apps and themes for Windows and post articles and resources about Windows, Linux, and other software. In August 2012,  Winaero started to publish English articles on its blog.

Winaero Tweaker was 0.1 was released on 9 March 2015 to make it easier for users to keep track of the different Winaero tools and make it easier for Tkachenko to maintain and develop.

Recognition
Winaero's software utilities have been recognised by WinSuperSite, Lifehacker, PCWorld, Engadget and several other reputable news sites and blogs. A number of Winaero tools have been featured on these sites.

References

External links
Official Website
Winaero Tweaker (Software)

Software companies of Russia
Technology websites
Companies based in Penza Oblast
Utilities for Windows
Freeware